Evil Twin is an EP by Hammerhead, released on December 7, 1993 through Amphetamine Reptile Records.

Track listing

Personnel 
Hammerhead
Paul Erickson – bass guitar
Jeff Mooridian Jr. – drums
Paul Sanders – guitar, vocals
Production and additional personnel
Tim Mac – recording on "Peep" and "U.V."
Rick Ness – recording
Ken Perry – recording

References

External links 
 

1993 EPs
Amphetamine Reptile Records EPs
Hammerhead (band) albums